Alla Oleksandrivna Beknazarova (born 28 August 1984) is a Ukrainian former competitive ice dancer. She is a three-time Ukrainian national champion — in 2001 with Yuriy Kocherzhenko and in 2007 and 2008 with Vladimir Zuev. Her best ISU Championship result, fourth, came at the 2001 World Junior Championships, competing with Kocherzhenko.

Career 
Beknazarova teamed up with Yuriy Kocherzhenko in late 1999 or early 2000. They were sent to the 2000 World Junior Championships, held in March in Oberstdorf, and finished 18th. In the 2000–01 season, Beknazarova/Kocherzhenko won gold at two JGP events and qualified for the ISU Junior Grand Prix Final, where they placed fourth. They also finished fourth at the 2001 World Junior Championships in Sofia. They won one senior international medal, bronze at the 2001 Karl Schäfer Memorial, and competed at two senior Grand Prix events and two senior ISU Championships. Their partnership ended in 2003. 

Later in 2003, Beknazarova began skating with Vladimir Zuev. They won a gold medal at the 2005 Ondrej Nepela Memorial and four international bronze medals — at the 2007 Nebelhorn Trophy, 2009 Winter Universiade, and 2009 Finlandia Trophy. They competed at one World Junior Championships, one senior World Championships, and four European Championships. Their best result, 11th, came at the 2010 European Championships. 

Beknazarova also skated with Sergei Verbillo.

Programs

With Zuev

With Kocherzhenko

Results

With Zuev

With Kocherzhenko

References

External links 

 
 

Ukrainian female ice dancers
Universiade medalists in figure skating
1984 births
Living people
Sportspeople from Odesa
Universiade bronze medalists for Ukraine
Competitors at the 2009 Winter Universiade
Competitors at the 2003 Winter Universiade
Competitors at the 2005 Winter Universiade